Queens of Country is a 2012 American comedy film directed by Ryan Page and Christopher Pomerenke and starring Lizzy Caplan.  The film's score was composed by Isaac Brock.

Cast
Lizzy Caplan as Jolene Gillis
Ron Livingston as Rance McCoy
Joe Lo Truglio as Penny McEntire
Matt Walsh as Cleveland Norvis
Maynard James Keenan as Bobby Angel
Wanda Jackson as herself
 Dave Karl as Kenny Rogers

Release
The film premiered on April 12, 2012 at the Chicago International Movies and Music Festival.

References

External links
 
 

2010s English-language films